WBA Asia (formerly known as Eurasia Pacific Boxing Council, also known as EPBC) is an organisation for professional boxing in the Central Asia, Oceania, Pan Pacific, Eurasia and Southeast and Far East nations. It was formed in 2014 and is headquartered in Seoul

History

WBC affiliation
In 2016, WBC released an open letter, stating the following:

"Eurasia Pacific Boxing Council is not a WBC Federation.  It is only a committee affiliated with the WBC, ..."

"Any request for a new federation or commission to affiliate to the WBC is a matter that must be addressed by the WBC Board of Governors in the annual conventions of the WBC."

This open letter came about due to MBC claimed that they have secured affiliation with WBC. However WBC shot the affiliation down and stated that MBC only has affiliation with EPBC and not WBC.

In February 2017, EPBC announced that they will be leaving the WBC to join WBA.

WBA affiliation
In February 2017, WBA Asia was accepted by WBA president Gilberto Jesús Mendoza. The final was on March 25 with Pavel Malikov won over Mirzhan Zhaksylykov for the WBA ASIA Lightweight title match. This was created alongside WBA Oceania title to replace the Pan Asian Boxing Association title which left and created their own sanctioning body called the World Boxing Society.

WBA Asia champions

References

External links
 
 

Professional boxing organizations
Sports organizations established in 2014
Boxing in Asia
Boxing in Oceania
Organizations based in Seoul
Asia